The Piore River is a river in northern Papua New Guinea.

See also
List of rivers of Papua New Guinea
Piore River languages

References

Rivers of Papua New Guinea